Silvia Azzoni (born 3 November 1973) is an Italian ballet dancer who performs at the Hamburg Ballet as a principal dancer.

Early life
Azzoni was born in Turin, Italy. She trained at Baletna Skola at her hometown, and later The School of The Hamburg Ballet in Germany.

Career
Azzoni joined the Hamburg Ballet in 1993, and became a soloist in 1996. She was named principal dancer in 2001. She had originated roles in John Neumeier's works, such as Olga Preobrajenska in Nijinsky, Aschenbach's Concepts in Death in Venice and The Angel Christmas Oratorio I-VI. Her repertoire also includes works by Frederick Ashton, George Balanchine, Mats Ek and Christopher Wheeldon. As a guest artist, she had danced in Germany, Russia, Poland, Italy, Japan, U.S., Taiwan, Australia and Austria. She had appeared in Alessandra Ferri's, Roberto Bolle's and Manuel Legris's galas, and performed with The Royal Ballet. Additionally, she held her own gala, Silvia Azzoni & Friends, in Italy.

Selected repertoire
Azzoni  repertoire with the Hamburg Ballet includes:

Awards
Source:
Dr.-Wilhhelm-Oberdörffer-Prize 1996
Danza & Danza Prize, 2004 – Best Italian Dancer Abroad
Rolf Mares Prize for the Hamburg Theaters, 2006/2007 – Outstanding Performance
Prix Benois de la Danse, 2008
Les Étoiles de Ballet 2000 Dance Award
Premio Positano, 2013 – Best Italian Female Dancer of the Year
Premio Roma, 2014

Personal life
Azzoni is married to Alexandre Riabko, also a ballet dancer.

References

Italian ballerinas
Prix Benois de la Danse winners
Living people
1973 births
Entertainers from Turin
Italian expatriates in Germany
Prima ballerinas
21st-century ballet dancers
21st-century Italian dancers
21st-century Italian women